The Central Great Southern Football League (CGSFL) was based in and around the Shire of Katanning. The CGSFL was formed in 1960 following a merger between the Katanning Football Association and Tambellup Football Association.  The CGSFL ran from 1960 to 1990 before it merged with the Southern Districts Football League (SDFL) to form the Great Southern Football League (GSFL). 

Teams from towns such as Nyabing, Kojonup, Tambellup, Gnowangerup, Dumbleyung, Kukerin and Katanning competed in the CGSFL.

Former clubs

Grand final results

References

 Great Southern Herald newspapers

Australian rules football competitions in Western Australia